The 2015–16 season was Ergotelis' 86th season in existence, 1st season in the Football League since the club's latest relegation from the Super League Greece, and ultimately the last season the club competed at a professional level, after its debut 14 years ago (2002). Ergotelis also participated in the Greek cup, entering the competition in the Second Round, and advancing up to the Round of 16. Unbearable financial issues forced club officials to withdraw the team from professional competitions on 19 January 2016.

Players 
Up until 19 January 2016

The following players have departed in mid-season

Out of team 

Note: Flags indicate national team as has been defined under FIFA eligibility rules. Players and Managers may hold more than one non-FIFA nationality.

Transfers

In

Promoted from youth system

Total spending:  0.00 €

Out 
 
Total income:  €550,000

Expenditure:   €550,000

Managerial changes

Kit
2015−16

|

Pre-season and friendlies

Pre-season friendlies

Competitions

Overview 

Last updated: 18 August 2015

Football League Greece

League table

Results summary

Matches 

1. As of 19 January 2016, all remaining Ergotelis matches were awarded to opponents (3-0), due to Ergotelis formally withdrawing from the league.

Greek Cup

Second round

Group B

Matches 

1. Matchday 2 vs. Panetolikos, originally meant to be held at the Pankritio Stadium was instead played at the local Theodoros Vardinogiannis Stadium, due to restoration works.

Round of 16

Matches

Statistics 
Up until 19 January 2016

Goal scorers

Last updated: 19 January 2016

References

Ergotelis
Ergotelis F.C. seasons